Admiral Gerald Charles Langley (13 October 1848 – 18 April 1914) was a Royal Navy officer.

References 

1848 births
1914 deaths
Royal Navy admirals
British naval attachés
Place of birth missing
Place of death missing